Nadu Iravil is a 1970 Indian Tamil-language crime thriller film, directed and produced by S. Balachander. The film's story was written by him and dialogue was written by Ve. Laxmanan, who also composed the music. It is based on Agatha Christie's 1939 novel And Then There Were None.

Plot 

Dhayanandam is a rich man who takes care of his wife Ponni, they have no children. Dr. Saravanan was the close friend of Dhayanandam, he tells about his blood cancer and he dies in 20 days. All Dhayanandam's assets are going in vain. Dr. Saravanan gives an idea, to call all his relations and they have come. Unfortunately, they are murdered one by one in the night. All are terrified. The suspicion on the murderer shifts onto Dr. Saravanan only for it to be revealed that the real murderer is Dhayanandam's handicapped brother.

Cast 
 Major Sundarrajan as Dhayanandam
 Pandari Bai as Ponni (Dhayanandam's wife)
 S. Balachander as Dr. Saravanan
 Sowcar Janaki as Ragini
 Cho Ramaswamy as Servar Mose
 V. Gopalakrishnan as Ranga Rajan, (Somanathan's Son-in-law/Leela's husband)
 V. R. Thilagam as Leela (Ranga Rajan's wife)
 M. S. S. Pakkiyam as Neelamegham's wife
 E. R. Sahadevan as Neelamegham
 K. Vijayan as Aravindhan (Vadivambal elder son)
 V. S. Raghavan as Jambulingam (Dhayanandam's younger brother / blind man)
 Sadhan as Kalyam (Aravindan's younger brother)
 Kottappuli Jayaraman as Joseph (Dhayanandam's house servant)
 Maali alias Mahalingam (Mohanambal's son)
 S.N.Lakshmi as Vadivambal (Dhayanandam's sister)
 C. V. V. Banthulu as Somanathan
 Kalpana as Anu Radha (Neelamegham's daughter)
 S. R. Janaki as Mohanambal (Dhayanandam's sister in law)
 Ramanujam as Mottaiyan
 Saroja as Pankajam (Mottaiyan's daughter)

Production 
After the success of Bommai (1964), S. Balachander launched a film named Nadu Iravil the same year. It was based on the 1939 novel And Then There Were None, by the British writer Agatha Christie. Unlike the novel, it features the characters in an urban house rather than being stranded on an island, but "dutifully follows the same idea of each one dying, with the assets of the deceased out for the taking".

Soundtrack 
The soundtrack was composed by S. Balachander, while the lyrics for the songs were written by Ve. Laxmanan.

Release and reception 
Though Balachander completed the film in 1964–1965, no distributor was willing to buy it, prompting him to distribute the film himself. Nadu Iravil was eventually released in 1970 and became a major success, prompting several distributors who earlier rejected the film, to return and beg Balachander for distributing it. The Indian Express wrote, "The movie succeeds as a very good entertainer entirely due to the directorial work of S. Balachander and Reddi's camera".

References

External links 
 

1970 films
1970s crime thriller films
1970s Tamil-language films
Films based on And Then There Were None
Films based on British novels
Films scored by S. Balachander
Films directed by S. Balachander
Indian black-and-white films
Indian crime thriller films